Samuel Langdon (January 12, 1723 – November 29, 1797) was an American Congregational clergyman and educator.  After serving as pastor in Portsmouth, New Hampshire, he was appointed president of Harvard University in 1774.  He held that post until 1780.

Life
Born in Boston, Massachusetts in 1723, Langdon attended Boston Latin School and graduated from Harvard in 1740. While teaching in Portsmouth, New Hampshire, he studied theology, and was licensed to preach. In 1745, he was appointed chaplain of a regiment, and was present at the capture of Fortress Louisbourg. On his return, he was appointed assistant to Reverend James Fitch of the North Church of Portsmouth.  He was ordained as pastor in 1747, and continued in that charge till 1774, when he became president of Harvard.

At Harvard, his ardent patriotism led him to adopt measures that were obnoxious to the Tory students, and although he endeavored to administer the government of the college with justice, his resignation was virtually compelled in 1780. The following year, he became pastor of the Congregational church at Hampton Falls, New Hampshire.

In 1788, he was a delegate to the New Hampshire convention that adopted the Constitution of the United States, often led its debates, and did much to remove prejudice against the Constitution.

Langdon was distinguished as a scholar and theologian, and exerted a wide influence in his community. The University of Aberdeen gave him the degree of Doctor of Divinity in 1762. He was a charter member of the American Academy of Arts and Sciences. He published Summary of Christian Faith and Practice (1768); Observations on the Revelations (1791); Remarks on the Leading Sentiments of Dr. Hopkins's System of Doctrines (1794) and many sermons. In 1761, in connection with Colonel Joseph Blanchard, he prepared and published a map of New Hampshire.

Langdon died in Hampton Falls, New Hampshire on November 29, 1797.

References

Portions of the above text are from Appletons Encyclopedia published 1887-1889, and are in the public domain.

External links
Massachusetts Historical Society copy of the Blanchard/Langdon map

1723 births
1797 deaths
Presidents of Harvard University
American theologians
American cartographers
Fellows of the American Academy of Arts and Sciences
People from colonial Boston
People from Boston
Boston Latin School alumni
Harvard University alumni
Patriots in the American Revolution